Konstantin Päts' fourth cabinet was in office in Estonia from 1 November 1932 to 18 May 1933, when it was succeeded by Jaan Tõnisson's fourth cabinet.

Members

This cabinet's members were the following:

References

Cabinets of Estonia